Andrea Ceccarini (born 14 April 1964) is an Italian former swimmer who competed in the 1980 Summer Olympics and in the 1988 Summer Olympics.

References

1964 births
Living people
Italian male swimmers
Italian male freestyle swimmers
Olympic swimmers of Italy
Swimmers at the 1980 Summer Olympics
Swimmers at the 1988 Summer Olympics
European Aquatics Championships medalists in swimming
Mediterranean Games gold medalists for Italy
Mediterranean Games medalists in swimming
Swimmers at the 1983 Mediterranean Games
Swimmers from Rome